This is a list of past arrangements of electoral divisions in Singapore. Each division sends at least one member to the Parliament of Singapore.

External links 
Elections Department

 Past
 Past
History of Singapore